Kalki mahamtra
“Jai Kalki Jai Jagatpate, Padma Pati Jai Ramapate”

Kalki Mandir is a Hindu temple in Jaipur, Rajasthan, India, which was built by Jai Singh II in the 18th century.One of the oldest Kalki Temple known. Kalki avtaar is the 10th incarnation of MahaVishnu ji who will end 28th Kaliyug. The temple is located in Sireh Deori Bazar opposite the palace gate. In the temple yard is a statue of a horse made of white marble. The temple contains statues of Kalki avatar and goddess Lakshmi.

References

Hindu temples in Rajasthan
Tourist attractions in Jaipur
Hindu temples in Jaipur